Terras Bridge, also known as Terras Pill Bridge, is a road bridge near Morval in Cornwall, England.

Description 
As well as the main span across the river channel, the bridge has a second small flood arch. The main bridge arch was navigable, maintaining the river's navigability to Sandplace. Downstream of the bridge, the only crossing of the river is Looe Bridge.

At the north side of the bridge, the road continues on a causeway over mudflats and saltings. At the north end of the causeway crosses the Liskeard and Looe Union Canal by another stone arch. The canal was approved by Parliament the same year the bridge opened, and began operation in 1827. A short distance upstream of the bridge was the canal's first lock which acted as a tidal barrier.

In 1985, Terras Bridge was made a Grade II listed structure.

Level crossing 
In 1853 the Liskeard and Looe Railway was built on the bank separating the river and canal. The railway line crosses the bridge's roadway at an open level crossing. The railway is now operated as the Looe Valley Line, and trains approaching the crossing are obliged to halt and sound their whistle before proceeding across the road subject to a  speed limit. 

, the crossing was one of 62 open level crossings listed by Network Rail, and is one of three such crossings on the Looe Valley Line.

Footnotes

References 

Bridges in Cornwall
Listed buildings in Cornwall
1820s establishments in England
Bridges completed in the 1820s